St Mark's Church is in High Street, Saltney, Cheshire, England.  It is an active Anglican parish church in the deanery of Chester, the archdeaconry of Chester, and the diocese of Chester.  Its benefice is combined with those of St Matthew, Saltney Ferry, and Sandy Lane Family Church, Lache-cum-Saltney.  The church is recorded in the National Heritage List for England as a designated Grade II listed building.

History

St Mark's was built in 1892–93, and designed by the Chester architect T. M. Lockwood.

Architecture

The church is constructed in red Ruabon brick, with stone bands, and has Westmorland slate roofs.  Its plan consists of a nave, a north timber-framed porch, a northeast vestry, a chancel with an apse, and a south chapel, also with an apse.  It has a bellcote standing on the ridge of the nave rather than on a gable.  At the west end are triple lancet windows flanked by buttresses.  Around the church are more lancet windows.  The bellcote consists of a tier of panels, above which is a tier of louvred bell openings, and a slated steeple surmounted by a weathervane.  On each side of the nave roof are three louvred and gabled lucarnes.  The stained glass includes some late work from the Kempe Studios designed by W. E. Tower.

See also

Grade II listed buildings in Chester (south)

References

Church of England church buildings in Cheshire
Grade II listed churches in Cheshire
Churches completed in 1893
19th-century Church of England church buildings
Diocese of Chester